This was the ninth season for the League Cup, known as the John Player Trophy for sponsorship reasons.

Bradford Northern won the trophy, beating Widnes 6–0 in the final. The match was played at Headingley, Leeds, West Yorkshire. The attendance was 9,909 and receipts were £11560.

Background 

The council of the Rugby Football League voted to introduce a new competition, to be similar to The Football Association and Scottish Football Association's "League Cup". It was to be a similar knock-out structure to, and to be secondary to, the Challenge Cup. As this was being formulated, sports sponsorship was becoming more prevalent and as a result John Player and Sons, a division of Imperial Tobacco Company, became sponsors, and the competition never became widely known as the "League Cup."

The competition ran from 1971–72 until 1995–96 and was initially intended for the professional clubs plus the two amateur BARLA National Cup finalists. In later seasons the entries were expanded to take in other amateur and French teams. The competition was dropped due to "fixture congestion" when Rugby League became a summer sport
The Rugby League season always (until the onset of "Summer Rugby" in 1996) ran from around August-time through to around May-time and this competition always took place early in the season, in the Autumn, with the final usually taking place in late January.

The competition was known by its sponsorship name, as the Player's No.6 Trophy (1971–1977), the John Player Trophy (1977–1983), the John Player Special Trophy (1983–1989), and the Regal Trophy in 1989.

The 1979–80 season saw no changes in the entrants, no new members and no withdrawals, the number remaining at eighteen. There were no drawn matches in the competition.

Competition and results

Round 1 – First  Round 

Involved  16 matches and 32 clubs

Round 2 – Second  Round 

Involved  8 matches and 16 clubs

Round 3 -Quarter-finals 

Involved 4 matches with 8 clubs

Round 4 – Semi-finals 

Involved 2 matches and 4 clubs

Final

Teams and scorers 

Scoring – Try = three points – Goal = two points – Drop goal = one point

Prize money 
As part of the sponsorship deal and funds, the  prize money awarded to the competing teams for this season is as follows :-

Note – the  author is unable to trace the award amounts for this season. Can anyone help ?

The road to success 
This tree excludes any preliminary round fixtures

Notes and comments 
1 * West Hull are a Junior (amateur) club from Hull
2 * Warrington official website and Wigan official archives shows the match played at Wilderspool but RUGBYLEAGUEproject shows Huyton at home
3 * Pilkington Recs are a Junior (amateur) club from St Helens, home ground was City Road until they moved to Ruskin Drive from 2011–12
4 * Wigan official archives give the attendance as 6,500 but RUGBYLEAGUEproject gives it as 6,707
5 * Wigan official archives gives the score as 21–10, but RUGBYLEAGUEproject gives it as 24–10
6 * Warrington official website shows the match played on 2 October but RUGBYLEAGUEproject and Wigan official archives show it played on 20 October 
7 * Wigan official archives show Salford at home, but RUGBYLEAGUEproject show Widnes at home
8  * Headingley, Leeds, is the home ground of Leeds RLFC with a capacity of 21,000. The record attendance was  40,175 for a league match between Leeds and Bradford Northern on 21 May 1947.

See also 
1979–80 Northern Rugby Football League season
1979 Lancashire Cup
1979 Yorkshire Cup
John Player Trophy
Rugby league county cups

References

External links
Saints Heritage Society
1896–97 Northern Rugby Football Union season at wigan.rlfans.com 
Hull&Proud Fixtures & Results 1896/1897
Widnes Vikings – One team, one passion Season In Review – 1896–97
The Northern Union at warringtonwolves.org
Huddersfield R L Heritage
Wakefield until I die

1980 in English rugby league
1979 in English rugby league
League Cup (rugby league)